The Castle of Zahara de la Sierra (Spanish: Castillo de Zahara de la Sierra) is a castle located in Zahara de la Sierra, Spain. It was declared Bien de Interés Cultural in 1993.

References 

Bien de Interés Cultural landmarks in the Province of Cádiz
Castles in Andalusia